Urania poeyi is a day-flying moth of the family Uraniidae.

Distribution
Urania poeyi is found in Cuba. Unlike Urania boisduvalii, which is found throughout the island, this species is restricted to the eastern part of Cuba.<ref name=clutch>Clutch size variation in Urania boisduvalii Journal of the Lepidopterists' Society 60(4), 2006, 227–228</ref> However, it is occasionally found in Jamaica as a stray.

Larvae of this species feed on Omphalea triandra''.

References

External links
Uraniidae - Yale University

Uraniidae
Moths described in 1866